Pleasant Run Creek is a stream in northern Barton and southern Vernon counties in the U.S. state of Missouri. It is a tributary of the Little Dry Wood Creek.

The stream headwaters arise along the west side of US Route 71 between Irwin and Sheldon. It flows generally northwest to its confluence with the Little Dry Wood Creek about three miles northeast of Bronaugh.

Pleasant Run Creek was so named due to the "pleasant" setting of its watercourse.

See also
List of rivers of Missouri

References

Rivers of Barton County, Missouri
Rivers of Vernon County, Missouri
Rivers of Missouri